Women's Super G World Cup 1989/1990

Calendar

Final point standings

In Women's Super G World Cup 1989/90 all results count.

References
 fis-ski.com

External links
 

World Cup
FIS Alpine Ski World Cup women's Super-G discipline titles